SWNT may refer to:

 Carbon nanotube#Single-walled, allotropes of carbon with a cylindrical nanostructure
 Scotland women's (national) football team